Eldon Chase Miller (born January 28, 1987) is an American former stock car racing driver, who last competed in the NASCAR Nationwide Series (now the Xfinity Series) in 2013. He currently works for Front Row Motorsports as a mechanic.

Racing career

2005–2008: Dodge development driver
Miller joined the ARCA Re/Max Series in 2005 at age 18 as a driver in Dodge's driver development program, He made his debut at Nashville driving the Bobby Jones Racing No. 88 car, where he ran in the top-five for a part of the race before running out of gas. Then, at Gateway, Miller led multiple laps before falling out due to transmission trouble. In 2006, Miller was tapped by Dodge to drive for the larger Cunningham Motorsports team in their No. 4 in six ARCA races that year. After an 11th-place finish at Nashville, Miller charged to the win at Pocono. He set the record as the youngest driver to ever win an ARCA race at Pocono to that point. He then backed up his win with a dominating performance at the second annual ARCA Pocono event before a cylinder failure took him from the lead, with only eight laps remaining, and forced him to a fifth-place finish. He also qualified on the pole at Gateway and was leading the race when more mechanical problems plagued him. His outstanding performance won him the opportunity to compete in the Craftsman Truck Series with the Dodge Development Team.

Miller joined up with Bobby Hamilton Racing to drive their No. 4 truck near the end of the 2006 season, also as a part of the Dodge driver development program. In only his fourth start, Miller scored a top ten at Martinsville Speedway. He earned the ride for the full season in 2007. However, after five races, Miller and BHR parted ways. He was soon hired by Ray Evernham to drive a part-time schedule in his Busch Series team's No. 9 car. In only his second career start, Miller scored a second-place qualifying effort at Kentucky Speedway, and a best finish of fifteenth at Gateway. In 2008, he ran twelve races in the No. 9 car once again, with sponsorship from Unilever and Verizon Wireless, as well as two additional races in the No. 19 car for Evernham. He had two top-ten finishes and finished 38th in points in a part-time schedule.

2009–2013: Start and park career
Gillett Evernham closed their Nationwide Series team at the end of the year after the team's merger with Petty Enterprises, and Miller spent the first few months of the 2009 season without a ride, before he drove most of the second half of the season, going back and forth between the No. 91 MSRP Motorsports Chevrolet and the JTG Daugherty Racing No. 47 Toyota. He also ran one race at Memphis in Derrike Cope's No. 73. For 2010, Miller filled in for David Gilliland in the standalone races in the No. 91 for D'Hondt-Humphrey Motorsports (formerly MSRP). He also drove a few races for other teams that year as well, which were Specialty Racing in the No. 61 and MacDonald Motorsports in the No. 82. All three rides were start and park entries. 

After running one race for Fleur-de-lis Motorsports in their No. 68, Miller found a solid ride about a third of the way into the 2011 season, driving the start-and-park No. 46 for Key Motorsports. He entered every race for the rest of the year starting at Iowa in May. He moved to two of Key's other cars for two races, with him in the No. 40 for Nashville and in the No. 42 for Montreal. In 2012, Miller drove for The Motorsports Group in the No. 46, start-and-parking for most of the season. At the start of 2013, he returned to start-and-park the TMG No. 46 for select races, but then left for TriStar Motorsports during the year, starting-and-parking in the team's No. 10 and No. 91 cars as well as in the No. 15 car for Rick Ware Racing.

2014–present: Crew member career
2013 was the last time that Miller was a driver. However, he remained employed at TriStar as a car chief for their No. 14 car of Eric McClure and Cale Conley and later a mechanic and crew chief for the team. According to his LinkedIn profile, in May 2015, he became TriStar's shop foreman, and after TriStar's Nationwide/Xfinity team was shut down in 2017, Miller joined Front Row Motorsports, where he currently works as a wiring mechanic.

Personal life
Chase graduated from Sequoyah High School.. Also according to his LinkedIn, he is a graduate of Mitchell Community College.

Motorsports career results

NASCAR
(key) (Bold – Pole position awarded by qualifying time. Italics – Pole position earned by points standings or practice time. * – Most laps led.)

Nationwide Series

 Season still in progress 
 Ineligible for series points

Craftsman Truck Series

K&N Pro Series West

ARCA Re/Max Series
(key) (Bold – Pole position awarded by qualifying time. Italics – Pole position earned by points standings or practice time. * – Most laps led.)

References

External links
 
 
 

1987 births
Living people
People from Canton, Georgia
Sportspeople from the Atlanta metropolitan area
Racing drivers from Georgia (U.S. state)
NASCAR drivers
ARCA Menards Series drivers
CARS Tour drivers
Evernham Motorsports drivers